HCA may refer to:

Courts
 High Court of Australia, the supreme court in the Australian court hierarchy and the final court of appeal in Australia

Organizations

Europe
 Hall–Carpenter Archives, an archive of materials related to gay activism in Britain
 Heidelberg Center for American Studies, an institute at Heidelberg University, Germany
 Helsinki Citizens' Assembly, a nongovernmental organization dedicated to peace, democracy and human rights in Europe
 Heritage Crafts Association, a UK charity that helps to preserve traditional hand crafts
 Homes and Communities Agency, a UK non-departmental public body

United States
 Heritage Christian Academy (disambiguation), several private Christian schools:
 Heritage Christian Academy (Fort Collins, Colorado)
 Heritage Christian Academy (Texas)
 Heritage Christian Academy (Kansas)
 Heritage Christian Academy (Minnesota)
 Heritage Christian Academy (New Jersey)
 Hopkins Consulting Agency, a student-run technology consulting company at The Johns Hopkins University
 Hospital Corporation of America, an operator of health care facilities

Other organizations
 Hillcrest Christian Academy, an independent primary school in South Africa
 Holy Child Academy, a Catholic school in Pagadian City, Philippines

Science and technology
 Heterocyclic amine, a type of chemical compound containing at least one heterocyclic ring
 Hexachloroacetone, an organic compound also called hexachloropropanone or perchloroacetone
 Hierarchical cluster analysis, a method of cluster analysis used in data mining
 High content analysis, a laboratory microscopic technique
 Host channel adapter, in electronic communications
 Hydroxycitric acid
 Holloway Cut Advisor, a method of rating brilliant cut diamonds
 Hot Cranking Amps, a measurement of the current provided by a car battery
 Hydrographic Commission on Antarctica

Other uses
 HCA (classification), a para-cycling classification
 HC Andersen (band), Finnish rock band
 Healthcare Assistant, a UK name for a job class of medical paraprofessionals
 Hennepin Center for the Arts, a building in Minneapolis, Minnesota, US
 Historical cost accounting